James Robert Cameron (September 11, 1938 – April 1, 1995) was an American football coach. He served as the head football coach at Howard Payne University from 1968 to 1971 and Angelo State University from 1972 to 1973, compiling a career college football coaching record of 34–27–4.

Cameron was born on September 11, 1938, to Noah and Kate Cameron. He attended Commerce High School in Commerce, Texas where he played basketball and football. He married his high school sweetheart, June Duncan. After he graduated from college at East Texas State University, Cameron coached high school football in McKinney, Sulphur Springs, Kilgore, Rockwall, Garland, and Waco. He had four children (Debra, Jeff, Joey, and Jessica) with his wife June. His last coaching position was head football coach and athletic director at Sulphur Springs High School. He died on April 1, 1995, of a heart attack at his residential home in Sulphur Springs. His final record was 208–79–13.  His coaching record at Howard Payne was 21–20–2.

Head coaching record

College

References

External links
 

1938 births
1995 deaths
Angelo State Rams football coaches
Howard Payne Yellow Jackets football coaches
High school football coaches in Texas
People from Commerce, Texas
People from Sulphur Springs, Texas